Dagö is the first album by the Estonian band Dagö, released in 2000.

Track listing
"Šveits" – 4:02
"Armastuslaul" – 3:10
"24.02.00" – 3:41
"Moedem" – 3:26
"Hei tuul" – 4:05
"Härra Sannikov" – 3:51
"Kuula, kuula" – 4:30
"Mõnikord ei vea" – 3:57
"Mööda" – 4:03
"Hallid päevad" – 3:38
"Tuuletallajad" – 3:47
"Cindy" – 4:06
"Aeg on maas" – 2:37
"Väikene mees" – 3:09

References
 Dagö, 2000

Dagö albums
Estonian-language albums
2000 debut albums